The Tennessee Department of Commerce and Insurance (TDCI) is a state Cabinet agency of the government of Tennessee. The main job of the agency is to regulate and license various businesses and industries within the state.

Operations
The TDCI is organized into the following divisions:
Consumer Insurance Services: Responsible for educating consumers about insurance and resolving insurance-related conflicts.
Insurance: Responsible for enforcing the state's insurance laws.
Regulatory Boards: Responsible for regulating and licensing many different businesses and professions.
Securities: Responsible for enforcing laws and regulations related to securities.
Fire Prevention: Responsible for administering fire prevention and protection programs throughout the state.
TennCare Oversight: Responsible for regulating and monitoring TennCare, the state's Medicaid program.

References

State agencies of Tennessee
State departments of commerce of the United States